Cyrtodactylus variegatus, also known as the variegated bow-fingered gecko or Moulmein forest gecko, is a species of gecko that is found in Myanmar and Thailand. However, it is uncertain whether any records from Thailand actually belong to this species.

References 

Cyrtodactylus
Reptiles of Myanmar
Reptiles of Thailand
Reptiles described in 1859
Taxa named by Edward Blyth